Markus Walger (born 24 August 1979) is a German international rugby union player, playing for the RK Heusenstamm in the Rugby-Bundesliga and the German national rugby union team.

Walger's last game for Germany, his 17th international, was against Spain on 15 November 2008. He is the brother of Dennis Walger, also a German international.

Walger was born in Offenbach am Main, and has played rugby since he was six years old.

Walger has also played for the Germany's 7's side in the past, like at the 2008 Hannover Sevens, the 2006 London Sevens and the World Games 2005 in Duisburg, where Germany finished 8th.

Honours

Club
 German sevens championship
 Champions: 2006

National team
 European Nations Cup - Division 2
 Champions: 2008

Stats
Markus Walger's personal statistics in club and international rugby:

Club

 As of 29 April 2012

National team

European Nations Cup

Friendlies & other competitions

 As of 6 March 2010

References

External links
 Markus Walger at scrum.com
   Markus Walger at totalrugby.de
 Markus Walger  at the Hannover Sevens website

1979 births
Living people
German rugby union players
Germany international rugby union players
RK Heusenstamm players
Rugby union wings
Sportspeople from Offenbach am Main